Philippine Air Lines Flight 158 was a Philippine Air Lines flight from Mactan–Cebu International Airport to Manila International Airport in Manila which crashed on 12 September 1969. Of the 42 passengers and five crew members on board, only one passenger and one flight attendant survived. It was the deadliest aviation accident in the Philippines involving commercial aircraft until the crash of Philippine Airlines Flight 206 in 1987 and the deadliest involving a BAC One-Eleven until it was surpassed by Austral Líneas Aéreas Flight 9 in 1977.

Aircraft 
The aircraft involved was a BAC One-Eleven Series 400 and made its first flight in 1966. It was delivered to Philippine Airlines that same year, having over 7,000 airframe hours at the time of the crash.

Causes 
The aircraft crashed due to high turbulence in a heavy rainstorm along with poor visibility at night.

References

External links

158
Aviation accidents and incidents in 1969
Airliner accidents and incidents caused by weather
Aviation accidents and incidents in the Philippines
Accidents and incidents involving the BAC One-Eleven
History of Rizal
1969 in the Philippines 
1969 disasters in the Philippines
September 1969 events in Asia
Airliner accidents and incidents involving controlled flight into terrain